Antonino Borzì (20 August 1852, in Castroreale – 24 August 1921, in Lucca) was an Italian botanist.

Life and career 
Antonino Borzì became a professor of botany at the University of Palermo in 1879 and at the University of Messina in 1892. In 1889 he was involved in reestablishing the Orto Botanico "Pietro Castelli" dell'Università di Messina. From 1892 to 1921 he was director of Orto botanico di Palermo.

Antonino Borzì was the first who described the biopolymer cyanophycin in 1887.

Works (selection) 
 . Messina, 1883-1894
 . Palermo, 1894-1909
 . Messina, 1885
 . Messina, 1884
 . Messina, 1886
 . Palermo, 1905
 . Rome, 1911
 . 1915
 . Palermo, 1917
 . Rome, 1920

1852 births
1921 deaths
19th-century Italian botanists
20th-century Italian botanists
Academic staff of the University of Palermo
Academic staff of the University of Messina